Georg Ruge (June 19, 1852 – January 21, 1919) was a German anatomist and primatologist who was a native of Berlin.

In 1875, he earned his doctorate at the University of Berlin, and later became an assistant to Karl Gegenbaur (1826-1903) in Heidelberg. At Heidelberg he performed important research involving primate morphology, particularly studies of its muscular system. In the mid-1880s he authored works that provided a foundation for comparative anatomical and phylogenetic studies on facial muscles in mammals.
 
In 1888 Ruge became a professor of anatomy at the University of Amsterdam, and in 1897 obtained the same position at the University of Zurich. Among his better known publications are the following works:
 Beiträge zum Wachsthum des menschlichen Unterkiefers (Contributions to the growth of the human mandible). dissertation
 Eintheilung der Gesichtsmuskulatur (Division of the facial muscles).
 Untersuchungen über die Gesichtsmuskulatur der Primaten, 1887—Studies of the facial muscles of primates.
 Über die Gesichtsmuskulatur der Halbaffen (On the facial muscles of lemurs).
 Leitfaden für Präparirübungen
 Über die peripherischen Gebilde des N. facialis bei Wirbelthieren (On the structure of peripheral facial nerve in vertebrates).

References 
 Pagel: Biographical Dictionary (translated biography)
  From here to eternity by Mario A. Di Gregorio

1852 births
1919 deaths
German anatomists
Scientists from Berlin
Academic staff of the University of Amsterdam
Academic staff of the University of Zurich